Zhovkva Raion was a raion in Lviv Oblast in western Ukraine. Its administrative center was the city of Zhovkva. The raion was abolished on 18 July 2020 as part of the administrative reform of Ukraine, which reduced the number of raions of Lviv Oblast to seven. The area of Zhovkva Raion was merged into Lviv Raion.

It was established in 1940.

At the time of disestablishment, the raion consisted of four hromadas:
 Dobrosyn-Maheriv settlement hromada with the administration in the urban-type settlement of Maheriv;
 Kulykiv settlement hromada with the administration in the urban-type settlement of Kulykiv;
 Rava-Ruska urban hromada with the administration in the city of Rava-Ruska;
 Zhovkva urban hromada with the administration in Zhovkva.

Villages 
Zashkiv, Zhovkva Raion
Liubelia

People 
 Yevhen Konovalets — a military commander of the Ukrainian People's Republic army and the leader of the Organization of Ukrainian Nationalists between 1929 and 1938
 Volodymyr Parasyuk — Ukrainian soldier, politician, activist, and People's Deputy of Ukraine

See also
 Administrative divisions of Lviv Oblast

References

External links
  zhovkva.org.ua

Former raions of Lviv Oblast
1940 establishments in Ukraine
Ukrainian raions abolished during the 2020 administrative reform